EMTA may refer to:

Embedded Multimedia Terminal Adapter, a combination cable modem and telephone adapter
Endless Mountains Transportation Authority (now BeST Transit, serving Bradford, Sullivan, and Tioga counties in Pennsylvania)
Erie Metropolitan Transit Authority
European Metropolitan Transport Authorities
Estonian Academy of Music and Theatre
Emergency Medical Technician Ambulance